La Chapelle-Montlinard is a commune in the Cher department in the Centre-Val de Loire region of France.

Geography
The Loire lateral canal runs through the village, which lies on the pilgrimage route known as St. James' Way.

Population

Sights
 The Val de Loire National Nature Reserve, opened in 1995.
 The Pépinières Arboretum Adeline horticultural nursery.

See also
Communes of the Cher department

References

Communes of Cher (department)